The women's 100 metres event at the 2009 European Athletics U23 Championships was held in Kaunas, Lithuania, at S. Dariaus ir S. Girėno stadionas (Darius and Girėnas Stadium) on 16 and 17 July.

Medalists

Results

Final
17 July
Wind: 0.2 m/s

Semifinals
16 July
first 3 in each heat and 2 best to the Final

Semifinal 1
Wind: -0.5 m/s

Semifinal 2

Heats
16 July
Qualified: first 3 in each heat and 4 best to the Semifinals

Heat 1
Wind: -1.6 m/s

Heat 2
Wind: -1.2 m/s

Heat 3
Wind: -2.0 m/s

Heat 4
Wind: -0.8 m/s

Participation
According to an unofficial count, 31 athletes from 18 countries participated in the event.

 (1)
 (1)
 (1)
 (1)
 (3)
 (1)
 (3)
 (3)
 (2)
 (1)
 (1)
 (3)
 (2)
 (1)
 (3)
 (1)
 (2)
 (1)

References

100 metres
100 metres at the European Athletics U23 Championships